Veronica Gedeon (1917 – March 28, 1937) was a 20-year-old commercial model from Long Island City whose murder (along with her mother, Mary, and a boarder, Frank Burns) during Easter Weekend in 1937 captivated New York City. It was reported widely in newspapers there. After Gedeon's murderer was apprehended there were substantial changes in the psychiatric laws in the state of New York.

The case was the subject of a 2015 episode of Investigation Discovery's series A Crime to Remember (Season 3, Episode 4, "Such A Pretty Face"). It was also featured in a 2017 episode of the Travel Channel’s series Mysteries at the Museum (Season 17, Episode 2, "Antis the Radar Dog, Bringing Up the Baby and the Art of Murder").

Lurid photographs

Gedeon appeared at an Illustrators Society show for models which was raided by members of the New York City Police Department on November 8, 1935. She posed for crime-oriented periodicals such as Inside Detective and Headquarters Detective. Her murder featured an ironic twist because of the sensational titles
of the pictorials she appeared in. In Party Girl, Pretty But Cheap, and I Am A White Slave photographs showed her "flimsily clad", beaten, smothered, and tied up.

Family history

Gedeon attended William Cullen Bryant High School. She was of Hungarian ethnicity,  from a family which came to the United States in 1907. The Gedeon family resided in Astoria, Queens until 1929. They moved to 316 East 50th Street where Gedeon's mother, Mary, ran a rooming house until December 5, 1936, when the establishment was turned over to a superintendent. Earlier Mary Gedeon operated several speakeasies during the latter portion of the Prohibition era.

Murderer's profile and arrest

The family relocated to an apartment at 316 East 50th street  (Beekman Place in the Turtle Bay  neighborhood), where Gedeon's mother took in boarders. A sculptor, Robert George Irwin, was found guilty of murdering Gedeon, her mother, and a roomer in a fifth floor apartment there on the night of March 28, 1937. Irwin spent time in and out of Bellevue Hospital Center and Rockland County Hospital. He was briefly a boarder at the Gedeons but was put out of the household after he developed a crush on Gedeon's sister Ethel.

The manhunt which apprehended Irwin covered eight states and was the largest since the Lindbergh kidnapping. In late June 1937 a Cleveland, Ohio hotel employee recognized Irwin whose photograph appeared in the periodical True Detective Mysteries. Irwin was working there as a bellhop but when confronted by the employee fled quickly to Chicago, Illinois, where he was taken into custody by police waiting for him at the depot. Irwin confessed his affection for Ethel and said that the murders had been accidents. He arrived at the Gedeon apartment searching for Ethel but became enraged to find that she no longer lived there. So he killed the Gedeon women and the lodger in anger after Mary Gedeon allowed him to come inside. Having once sculpted a conventional bust of  Herbert Hoover, Irwin admitted he wanted to behead Ethel and make a death mask.

References

1917 births
1937 deaths
Female models from New York (state)
American people of Hungarian descent
People murdered in New York City
Place of birth missing
American murder victims
Models from New York City
People from Long Island City, Queens
20th-century American women
 1937 murders in the United States
 violence against women in the United States
People from Turtle Bay, Manhattan